Donoi Airport   is a public airport located in Uliastai, the capital of Zavkhan Province in Mongolia. It is also called New Uliastai Airport.

See also
 List of airports in Mongolia

References

External links 
Civil Aviation Authority of Mongolia

Airports in Mongolia